Barbarossa is a 1996 industrial album by the UK band Cubanate. The track "Joy" from the album has been released as a single.

Track listing
 "Vortech I" – 2:57
 "Barbarossa" – 6:13
 "Joy" – 3:32
 "Why Are You Here?" – 4:32
 "Exultation" – 4:24
 "The Musclemen" – 3:47
 "Come Alive" – 5:56
 "Vortech II" – 6:43
 "Lord of the Flies" – 8:33

References

1996 albums
Cubanate albums
Dynamica albums